The 1934 Ice Hockey World Championships were held from February 3–11, 1934, at the Palazzo del Ghiaccio in Milan, Italy. Canada won its seventh world championship, defeating the United States in the final. The World Championship bronze medal and the European Championship title went to Germany. It was the second European Championship title for the Germans.

Like the previous year's World Championship twelve teams participated, with defending champions United States and Canada advancing directly to the second-round. The other ten teams split into three preliminary groups for the six remaining second round places. In the preliminary Group C, there was a stalemate among the three teams; all three earned two points with equal goal differentials. As a result, the organizing committee decided that all three teams in Group C should advance. With nine instead of eight teams in the second round, the format was changed from two groups of four teams to three groups of three teams. The group winners advanced directly to the semi-finals, while the fourth semifinal position was decided by an extra qualifying round for the second-place finishers. The second and third place teams in the extra qualifying round were awarded fifth and sixth positions, and the six teams not advancing to the semifinals or semifinal qualification round played a round-robin series for positions seven through twelve.

First round

Group A

Group B

Group C

Second round

Group A

Group B

Group C

Third round

Semifinal qualifying round

Consolation round—7th to 12th places 
As the bottom finishers in their respective preliminary groups (group C qualified all its teams for the second round), Great Britain and Belgium played a qualification match to determine which of them joined the round robin; the loser (Belgium) finished the tournament in 12th place.

Semifinal and final rounds

Final rankings—World Championship 

1934 World Champion

Team members

Final rankings—European Championship 

1934 European Champion

Citations

References 
 Complete results
 
 

World Championships,Men
1934
World Championships,1934
Sports competitions in Milan
February 1934 sports events
1934 Ice Hockey World Championships